Against Jovinianus (Latin: Adversus Jovinianum) is a two-volume treatise by the Church Father Saint Jerome.

Jovinianus' propositions

Jovinianus, about whom little more is known than what is to be found in Jerome's treatise, published a Latin treatise outlining several opinions:
That a virgin is no better, as such, than a wife in the sight of God.
Abstinence from food is no better than a thankful partaking of food.
A person baptized with the Spirit as well as with water cannot sin. (as wrongly interpreted by Jerome, however Jovinian was actually referring to the impossibility of lapsing from the faith)
All sins are equal.
There is but one grade of punishment and one of reward in the future state.

In addition to this, he held the birth of Jesus Christ to have been by a "true parturition," and was thus refuting the orthodoxy of the time, according to which, the infant Jesus passed through the walls of the womb as his Resurrection body afterwards did, out of the tomb or through closed doors.

Response to Jovinianus
Pammachius, Jerome's friend, brought Jovinian's book to the notice of Siricius, bishop of Rome, and it was shortly afterwards condemned in synods at that city and at Milan about 390 CE.

He subsequently sent Jovinian's books to Jerome, who answered them in the present treatise in 393. Little is known of Jovinian, but it has been conjectured from Jerome's remark in the treatise against Vigilantius, where Jovinian is said to have "amidst pheasants and pork rather belched out than breathed out his life," and by a kind of transmigration to have transmitted his opinions into Vigilantius, that he had died before 409, the date of that work.

Outline of Against Jovinianus 

The first book is wholly on the first proposition of Jovinianus, that relating to marriage and virginity. The first three chapters are introductory. The rest may be divided into three parts:

Chapters 4–13 - An exposition, in Jerome's sense, of St. Paul's teaching in I Cor. 7.
Chapters 14–39 - A statement of the teaching which Jerome derives from the various books of both the Old and the New Testaments.
 A denunciation of Jovinianus (chapter 40), praise of virginity, and critique of marriage as a source of worldly distraction.

References

External links

Jerome, Against Jovinianus (text in English)
Jerome, Against Jovinianus (text in Latin)
Jerome, Against Vigilantius (text in English)
 

4th-century Christian texts
Works by Jerome